If These Walls Could Talk 2 is a 2000 television film in the United States, broadcast on HBO. It is a sequel to the 1996 HBO film If These Walls Could Talk, and like the earlier film is a female-centered anthology film, with three separate segments all set in the same house within three different decades in the 20th century. Unlike the earlier film, in which all the stories related to abortion, in this film all the storylines deal with lesbian couples.

The three segments, "1961", "1972" and "2000", were directed by Jane Anderson, Martha Coolidge, and Anne Heche, respectively.

Plot

1961
An elderly couple, Edith (Vanessa Redgrave) and Abby (Marian Seldes) sit in a cinema watching a lesbian-themed film The Children's Hour. A couple walks out of the theater in disgust at the film, and a group of kids laugh when they see Edith and Abby holding hands. Later, at the home they have shared for 30 years, Abby falls from a ladder. At the hospital, the doctors tell Edith that Abby may have suffered a stroke. Edith asks to see Abby but is not permitted as she is not a family member. Instead she spends the night in the waiting room and in the morning she learns from a more sympathetic nurse that Abby died alone during the night, and none of the hospital workers informed her after it had happened.

Edith telephones Abby's nephew, Ted (Paul Giamatti), her only living relative, to tell him the news. Before Ted and his family come for the funeral, Edith removes all traces that they were a couple. She makes it look like they had separate bedrooms and removes photographs of the two of them together. At the house afterwards, Ted and Edith talk about the fact that the house was in Abby's name. Although Edith contributed equally to the mortgage, she legally owns no part of it. As Ted’s wife Alice packs up Abby's belongings, Ted tells Edith that he would consider letting Edith staying in the house and paying him rent. Edith tells him that Abby would have wanted her to stay in the house, as that was what they always talked about. Ted eventually tells her that it would be better if he sells the house and she finds a place of her own although he says that he'll wait until she finds a new place before putting the house on the market. The family leaves, with Ted telling Edith that he will be in touch in a couple of weeks to discuss what she is going to do.

1972
Linda (Michelle Williams), a young student, now shares the house with three friends, all lesbians. They face conflict with the feminist group they are part of when the other women do not want to include lesbian issues despite the fact that Linda and her friends helped to found the group and fought for free contraception on campus with their straight friends.

At a lesbian bar they have not been to before, they are surprised and disappointed to see women apparently fulfilling traditional butch and femme roles. They laugh at Amy (Chloë Sevigny), a young butch woman who is wearing a tie. Amy asks Linda to dance but she refuses while her friends are still there. The others soon leave and Linda stays behind and dances with Amy. Later, Amy gives Linda a ride home on her motorcycle and they kiss. Linda invites Amy to return the next day.

The next day Linda and the others are arguing with a woman from the feminist group when Amy arrives. Linda is embarrassed and is short with Amy who quickly leaves. Linda's friends tease her about Amy and question how they can be taken seriously as feminists if they associate with people like Amy. They cannot understand why a woman would dress like a man when they have fought so hard to escape such stereotypical roles.

Linda goes to Amy's house and apologizes. They sleep together. The next morning Linda sees a picture of Amy as a child, dressed like a boy. She asks Amy if Amy is supposed to be the man and Linda the woman. Amy says no and accuses Linda of being afraid that people will know what she is if she is seen with Amy.

Amy goes to Linda's house for dinner. Linda urges her friends to give Amy a chance but an awkward evening deteriorates when Linda's friends criticize Amy and try to make her change her clothes. Amy leaves, upset. Linda follows her home and tells her that she was never ashamed of Amy, but only of herself. They reconcile.

2000
The house is now inhabited by Fran (Sharon Stone) and Kal (Ellen DeGeneres), a couple hoping to have a baby together. They hope to get a sperm donation from Tom (George Newbern) and Arnold (Mitchell Anderson), a gay couple, but when the men are reluctant to agree to stay out of the baby's life, the women decide not to go ahead. Later, Kal tells Fran that she does not want to know the father of the baby and they agree to use an anonymous donor. They look for donors on the internet and find a company to use. Going through endless profiles of potential donors, Kal gets upset that she herself cannot get Fran pregnant.

When they discover that Fran is ovulating, Kal hurries to the donor company to get the sperm. She inseminates Fran, but with no success. After visiting the local elementary school a few times, they share their worries for their child. Fran and Kal know that their baby will face discrimination because of society's views on lesbian families, but hope that their love for each other and their child will be enough. After three attempts to get pregnant, they go to a doctor to help them conceive. Shortly afterwards they discover that Fran is pregnant.

Cast

1961
 Vanessa Redgrave as Edith Tree
 Marian Seldes as Abby Hedley
 Paul Giamatti as Ted Hedley
 Elizabeth Perkins as Alice Hedley
 Jenny O'Hara as Marge Carpenter
 Marley McClean as Maggie Hedley

1972
 Michelle Williams as Linda
 Chloë Sevigny as Amy
 Nia Long as Karen
 Natasha Lyonne as Jeanne
 Heather McComb as Diane
 Amy Carlson as Michelle
 Lee Garlington as Georgette

2000
 Sharon Stone as Fran
 Ellen DeGeneres as Kal
 Regina King as Allie
 Kathy Najimy as Doctor
 Mitchell Anderson as Arnold
 George Newbern as Tom

Awards and nominations
 Emmy Awards
 Outstanding Supporting Actress in a Miniseries or a Movie – Vanessa Redgrave (won)
 Outstanding Made for Television Movie (nomination)
 Outstanding Writing for a Miniseries or a Movie (nomination)
 Outstanding Casting for a Miniseries, Movie or a Special (nomination)
 Golden Globe Awards
 Best Supporting Actress in a Series, Mini-Series or Motion Picture Made for TV – Vanessa Redgrave (won)
 NAACP Image Awards
 Outstanding Actress in a Television Movie, Mini-Series or Dramatic Special – Nia Long (nomination)
 Screen Actors Guild Awards
 Outstanding Performance by a Female Actor in a Television Movie or Miniseries – Vanessa Redgrave (won)
 Satellite Awards
 Outstanding Actress in a Television Movie, Mini-Series or Dramatic Special – Vanessa Redgrave (nomination)
Women in Film Crystal + Lucy Awards
Lucy Award (2000) to the Creators and Cast of If These Walls Could Talk and If These Walls Could Talk 2. In recognition of excellence and innovation in a creative work that has enhanced the perception of women through the medium of television

See also 
 List of LGBT-related films directed by women

References

External links 
 
 

2000 films
2000 television films
2000 LGBT-related films
2000 romantic drama films
2000s English-language films
American LGBT-related television films
American romantic drama films
Films directed by Anne Heche
Films directed by Jane Anderson
Films directed by Martha Coolidge
Films scored by Basil Poledouris
Films set in 1961
Films set in 1972
Films set in 2000
HBO Films films
Lesbian-related films
Lesbian-related television shows
Television sequel films
Films with screenplays by Jane Anderson
American drama television films
2000s American films